Galin Georgiev (born 23 March 1970) is a retired Bulgarian triple jumper, best known for placing seventh at the 1996 Summer Olympics.

His personal best triple jump was 17.14 metres, achieved in May 1998 in Sofia. This ranks him fifth among Bulgarian triple jumpers, behind Khristo Markov, Rostislav Dimitrov, Momchil Karailiev and Nikolay Raev. His personal best long jump was 8.20 metres, achieved in June 1992 in Sofia. This ranks him sixth among Bulgarian long jumpers, behind Ivaylo Mladenov, Atanas Atanasov, Nikolay Atanasov, Petar Dachev and Nikolay Antonov.

Achievements

References

1969 births
Living people
Bulgarian male triple jumpers
Bulgarian male long jumpers
Athletes (track and field) at the 1992 Summer Olympics
Athletes (track and field) at the 1996 Summer Olympics
Olympic athletes of Bulgaria
20th-century Bulgarian people